William Weston (January 24, 1803 - March 19, 1875) was an attorney and politician in Burlington, Vermont, and Brooklyn, New York.  He served in several local and state offices, and is most notable for his service as a member of the Vermont Senate in the 1850s.

Early life
Weston was born in Reading, Massachusetts on January 24, 1803, the son of William Weston and Synthe (Porter) Weston.  He was raised in Montreal, where his father had moved his family shortly after his birth.  His father died in 1818, and Weston moved to Craftsbury, Vermont, where he began a career as a merchant, first in Craftsbury, and later in Newport.  In 1827, Weston began to study law in the office of Augustus Young, and in 1829 he moved to Burlington, where he continued to study law with attorney Charles Adams.  He was admitted to the bar in 1830, and practiced in Burlington.

Career
After settling in Burlington, Weston became active in politics, and was an advocate of abolishing slavery.  He moved from the Whig Party to the Free Soil Party, back to the Whigs, and then to the Republican Party as the abolition movement coalesced and expanded during the 1840s and 1850s.  In addition to advocating the abolition of slavery, Weston was also active in the temperance movement.

Prior to Burlington's incorporation as a city, it had a town government, and Weston served as a justice of the peace, and was a member of the board of selectmen in 1829, and from 1850 to 1853.  From 1836 to 1847, Weston was Chittenden County's register of probate, and he was the assistant secretary of the Vermont Senate in 1836, 1837, 1838, 1839, and 1840.  From 1839 to 1842 he was the reporter of decisions for the Vermont Supreme Court, and in 1842, Weston served as secretary for the state Council of Censors, the body that met every seven years to review actions of the executive and legislative branches and ensure their constitutionality.  In 1847 he was assistant clerk of the Vermont House of Representatives.  In 1849 and 1850, Weston was elected to the Vermont Senate; he served until 1851, and was the Senate's President pro tempore in 1850.

In 1860, Weston moved to Brooklyn, New York, and he practiced law in New York City until his death.  In 1872, Weston was a supporter of the Liberal Republican Party and the presidential candidacy of Horace Greeley.

Death and burial
Weston died in Brooklyn on March 19, 1875.  He was buried in Plot 206 of Locust Street Cemetery in Burlington. The street's name was later changed to Elmwood Avenue, and the burial ground is now known as Elmwood Cemetery.

Family
In 1835, Weston married Sarah Maria Lyman (d. 1843).  Their only child, Ellen, was born in 1841 and died in 1844.  In 1858, he married Melinda Colver (1819-1896).  They had no children.

Honors
In 1846, Weston received the honorary degree of Master of Arts from the University of Vermont.

References

Sources

Books

Newspapers

Internet

External links

1803 births
1875 deaths
People from Reading, Massachusetts
People from Craftsbury, Vermont
People from Newport (city), Vermont
People from Burlington, Vermont
People from Brooklyn
Vermont lawyers
Lawyers from New York City
19th-century American politicians
Vermont Whigs
Vermont Free Soilers
Republican Party Vermont state senators
Presidents pro tempore of the Vermont Senate
New York (state) Liberal Republicans
Burials in Vermont
19th-century American lawyers